The Cabinet of Jordan is the chief executive body of the Hashemite Kingdom of Jordan.

References

External links 
 Prime Ministry website
 Government of Prime Minister Marouf Bakhit, Embassy of the Hashemite Kingdom of Jordan

Cabinet of Jordan
Prime Ministry of Jordan
2012 establishments in Jordan
2013 disestablishments in Jordan
Cabinets established in 2012
Cabinets disestablished in 2013